Azalia is an unincorporated community in Monroe County in the U.S. state of Michigan. The community is located within Milan Township. As an unincorporated community, Azalia has no legally defined boundaries or population statistics of its own but does have its own post office with the 48110 ZIP Code.

History
The community was first known as East Milan, or Reeves Station where a family named Reeves established the Star Bending Company. A post office opened on August 4, 1869 (or in 1866 by some accounts), largely through the efforts of Daniel T. Hazen, to avoid having to travel to West Milan (now Cone) to pick up mail. Steven Frink was the first postmaster, followed by Hazen in 1867, Joseph Meadows in 1872, John M. Lewis in 1877, and A.C. Reynolds in 1884. On September 1, 1887, the postmaster-general issued orders changing the name of the post office from "East Milan" to "Azalia", which was the name of the railroad station and also named Meadows as postmaster again.

The Toledo, Ann Arbor and Grand Trunk Railway (later the Toledo, Ann Arbor and North Michigan Railway and then the Ann Arbor Railroad), opened on June 8, 1878, with a station named "Azalia", named after one of the daughters of the president of the railroad, Azalia Ashley.

A Methodist Episcopal Church began holding classes in the early 1850s, building a church in 1870, which continues to the present as the Azalia United Methodist Church.

Images

References 

Unincorporated communities in Monroe County, Michigan
Populated places established in 1869
Unincorporated communities in Michigan
1869 establishments in Michigan